Ralph Bullock may refer to:

 Ralph Bullock, founder of Bullocks Coaches
 Ralph Bullock (jockey), a British jockey who won the 1861 Epsom Derby